James Joseph Hornbrook (August 5, 1868 – October 1, 1942) was an American brigadier general during World War I. Hornbrook participated in frontier duty, the Spanish–American War, the Pancho Villa Expedition, and World War I.

Early life and education
James Joseph Hornbrook was born in Evansville, Indiana on August 5, 1868 to Saunders Richards Hornbrook and his wife, Lucy (Wheeler) Hornbrook. He attended the schools of Evansville and graduated from Evansville High School in 1884. Hornbrook was then selected to attend the United States Military Academy, from which he graduated in 1890.

Career
After his commissioning, Hornbrook joined the 2nd Cavalry at Fort Bowie, Arizona.

On February 2, 1907, he received the rank of captain. He served as paymaster for the 12th Cavalry Regiment at Fort Omaha, Nebraska and in Manila, Philippines from October 1, 1908 to October 1, 1912.

He attained the rank of major and served with the 6th Cavalry Regiment on October 3, 1912.

He participated in the Punitive Expedition in 1916 and 1917.

During World War I, he traveled to France with the 4th Division.

Hornbrook returned stateside on July 31, 1918 and was stationed at Headquarters for the Southern Department until August 11, 1918.

He was honorably discharged from federal service as a brigadier general on March 10, 1919. He returned to the rank of colonel.

From October 1, 1919 to May 26, 1920, Hornbrook commanded the 5th Cavalry Regiment at Big Bend District, Texas.

He retired on September 2, 1929.

Family life
In 1895, Hornbrook married Mary Worth Sanno, the daughter of Brigadier General James M. J. Sanno (1840–1907), a career army officer and Union veteran of the American Civil War.

Death and legacy
Hornbrook died in Hollywood, California on October 1, 1942. He was buried at Arlington National Cemetery.

References

1868 births
1942 deaths
People from Evansville, Indiana
United States Military Academy alumni
United States Army generals
Burials at Arlington National Cemetery
United States Army generals of World War I
Military personnel from Indiana